Sweek is a surname. Notable people with the surname include:

Bill Sweek (born 1947), American basketball player and coach
John Sweek, namesake of American residence John Sweek House

See also
Sweeck, surname